The Himalaya ground skink (Ablepharus himalayanus) is a species of skink found in Pakistan, India, Nepal, and Turkmenistan.

References

Ablepharus
Reptiles described in 1864
Taxa named by Albert Günther